Conundrum Hot Springs is a geothermal spring in a remote section of the Maroon Bells-Snowmass Wilderness area of the White River National Forest in Colorado Rocky Mountains.

Description

The hot mineral water collects in existing craters as well as several primitive rock-lined soaking pools that have been dug out nearby. The hot spring water is channeled into two main soaking pools via a hand-built rock-lined waterway. The larger soaking pool is 15 feet in diameter and approximately 4.5 feet deep. The water temperature in the large soaking pool is approximately 98°F/36.5°C. There is no camping allowed at the springs.

Conundrum hot springs are the among the highest in altitude in the United States. The springs are located in a scenic setting, with views of mountains, avalanche chutes and waterfalls. The larger soaking pools can fit ten or more people.

In recent years there have been problems at the springs with human feces being left by hikers, campers and spring users which can contaminate the water with pathogens. The forest service is asking that people pack it out on their return hike. Dogs are not allowed within 2.5 miles of the hot spring site, and all waste, including feces must be packed out.

Location
The hot springs are located approximately 5 hours from Aspen by car. The springs are an 8.5 mile hike from the Conundrum Creek trailhead. The site is surrounded by 14,000-foot mountains, and are located above the tree line. The weather can change rapidly in the area. The hike involves a gain of 2,500 in elevation to 11,200 feet.

Water profile
The hot mineral water emerges from the ground at 122 °F. The temperature of the soaking pools are approximately 98 °F. The water is air cooled while flowing through the rock-lined channels before reaching the soaking pools.

See also
 List of hot springs in the United States
 List of hot springs in the world

References

Hot springs of Colorado